Eucalyptus whitei, commonly known as White's ironbark, is a eucalypt that is native to Queensland.

Description
It has dark grey to black coloured ironbark that extends to the smaller branches.

Taxonomy
Eucalyptus whitei was first formally described in 1925 by Joseph Maiden and William Blakely in the Journal and Proceedings of the Royal Society of New South Wales. The specific epithet honours the Cyril Tenison White, a grandson of the noted Queensland botanist Frederick Manson Bailey, for "distinguished services to the botany of his State. It is closely related to E. staigeriana and to E. melanophloia.

Distribution
The tree has a scattered distribution and is endemic to central and northern parts of Queensland from around Jericho in the south extending to the north-west to around Hughenden with another disjunct population in the Newcastle Range that is further to the north and is also found on the Windsor Tableland.

See also
List of Eucalyptus species

References

Trees of Australia
whitei
Myrtales of Australia
Flora of Queensland
Plants described in 1925